Mordin Solus is a fictional character in BioWare's Mass Effect franchise, who serves as a party member (or "squadmate") in Mass Effect 2. A salarian (one of Mass Effects alien races) physician and life scientist who was once a member of the salarian intelligence organization Special Tasks Group ("STG") earlier in his life, Mordin is depicted as a fast-talking and affable individual who is initially guided by scientific principles and logic, but later changes his mind and adopts strong moral standards as well as a respect for all forms of life.

Within the series' narrative, Mordin helped create and distribute measures to strengthen an artificial population control plague, named the Genophage, used against the krogan, a fast-breeding warlike alien race. He returns in Mass Effect 3, where he returns to STG as a special consultant, whilst also working as an inside source for Clan Urdnot, the dominant kinship group among the krogan. His goal is to develop a cure for the Genophage in response to the galaxy-wide invasion by the antagonistic Reapers and intends to distribute it in the atmosphere of Tuchanka, the krogan homeworld. The ninth issue of Mass Effect: Foundation explores the backstory behind his contributions to the strengthened Genophage.

Mordin is voiced by Michael Beattie in 2 and William Salyers in 3. His race was conceived as a variant of the grey alien archetype, while the character is designed with clothes that hint towards a labcoat. Inspiration for his face was taken from Clint Eastwood, whose cinematic acting roles 
a brilliant yet also a competent soldier. David Kates composed his musical theme, a highly electronic piece in comparison to some of 2s more orchestral pieces.

The character has been positively received, being nominated for three "Best New Character" awards and earning numerous placements in "top character" lists. At one point in the second game, Mordin sings an alternate version of Gilbert and Sullivan's Major-General's Song; numerous critics considered it one of the trilogy's best moments. As with other Mass Effect squadmates, merchandise for Mordin has been made, such as a bust.

Character overview

Mordin is a male salarian, nearing the end of his species' typical lifespan. He is described as being "guided by scientific principles rather than morals", willing to do what is necessary for the greater good, though nevertheless eccentric. David Kates, creator of his musical theme, believed him to add a little comic relief to the game, calling him "quirky, a little bit disorganized, definitely cerebral, overthinking". However, at the same time he noted Mordin's hard-edge side, something he found fascinating about the character.

A brilliant scientist, Mordin is said to have previously worked for the Special Tasks Group (STG), a salarian espionage organisation. While working for them, he modified the Genophage, a virus that almost sterilised the krogan. after it was revealed the krogan were naturally overcoming it. Despite holding some regrets over doing so, working on the Genophage proved intellectually challenging, and he believes if he hadn't done it, someone less skilled might have—risking completely sterilizing the krogan by accident.

Creation and development

The core concept of Mordin's design brief essentially asked "What would the Clint Eastwood salarian look like?", and to that end one piece of concept art directly took features from a picture of Eastwood and incorporated them on a salarian, leading to Mordin's aged look. Due to his relative old age, Mordin allowed the developers to explore the later lifestages of the Mass Effect universe's aliens. 

The vocal specifications, given to auditioners, wanted someone able to be both dramatic and comedic, referencing Marshall Flinkman of Alias. The character was voiced by Michael Beattie in Mass Effect 2, though was replaced with William Salyers for 3. Ginny McSwain served as the voice director. Initially, Beattie tried a higher-pitched voice, but as all the salarians were pitched-up he ultimately used something more like his natural voice. After being replaced, Beattie wrote an open letter thanking fans who had vied for his return. Beattie has said he would be interested in reprising the character, whether it be in a movie adaptation or a future game.

Each squadmate in Mass Effect 2 had music composed for them, intended to convey their character; BioWare gave the composers detailed character studies for each to help. Mordin's theme was composed by David Kates, who also worked on themes for other characters like Garrus. Kates had previously worked on the soundtrack for the first game. He considered Mordin's level one of the most fascinating to do, and it is one of the more electronic pieces. The composition contained many counterpoint elements, as well as "early retro synthesizer qualities".

A proposed confrontation scene between Mordin and a krogan squadmate named Grunt, which occurs after he discovers the Genophage's backstory as well as Mordin’s role as the scientist who strengthened it, was cut during the development of Mass Effect 2. Writer Brian Kindregan explained in an interview that planned content is usually cut due to time and financial considerations: in this instance, the team had already developed two major confrontation scenes between other squadmates, which may complicate the player's preparations for the suicide mission due to the potentially irreparable loss of a squadmate’s loyalty. Further costs would be incurred if Grunt's voice actor was called in for a further voiceover session, which in turn would necessitate the organization of more sessions as well as work on animation sequences. From a narrative standpoint, Kindregan also believed that a character with low emotional intelligence like Grunt would take the direct approach by attacking and killing Mordin, as opposed to making a scene and demanding that Shepard takes his side for his argument with Mordin.  

Patrick Weekes wrote the character for Mass Effect 3. When first handed the character's description, Weekes' initial reaction was "unrecordable, but translated roughly as 'that jerk, him being a fan of the first game's krogan squadmate Urdnot Wrex. Weekes saw two ways to take the character: either have him as an unlikeable "war criminal", or challenge himself to make a character who believed he had made the hard choice and did the right thing. Mordin's final scene on Tuchanka in the third game, and its variations, was influenced by both Weekes and fellow senior writer John Dombrow, who wrote the Genophage arc in the game. Weekes wished to give Mordin a "good send-off" in the scene.

Design

When creating the salarians, early on the designers played around with the general image of the grey alien archetype, having big eyes and grey skin. However, unlike regular grey aliens, salarians ended up with a concave torso and "doglike" legs. Different concepts of salarians were drawn, though many were rejected for being too human-looking. Unlike some of the other races, the salarians are more of "warrior poets" and are supposed to have a higher sense of culture. The heavy eyelids and long face add more sophistication. Their big black eyes express "tranquility" and "alertness". The concave chest is a more alien, unusual structure, and differed from some of the other races. This structure also led to stylistic choices with their clothing, under the idea that they'd stuff fabric there after meeting other races, which art director Matt Rhodes compared to "a bald man wearing a toupée".

Compared to other salarians, Mordin's skin color is more mottled and multi-colored, while his eyes are smaller, almost as if in a permanent squint. Mordin's design specifically tried to balance his scientific side and his ability as a combat-ready tech specialist due to time in the salarian special forces. His final appearance resembles a labcoat, and is similar to other medical characters in the series. The metal collar serves to break up his silhouette, though serves no purpose in dialogue or lore. Early sketches explored him as a field medic or very experienced scientist.

Other early concepts tried altering his head horns and eyeshape to make him unique. In his finished design, Mordin is missing one horn, unexplained with its origins left to the player's imagination. The missing horn is given alternate in-universe explanations in the second game's Lair of the Shadow Broker downloadable content pack and in the Mass Effect: Foundation comic series.

Appearances

Mass Effect 2

Mordin Solus debuts in 2010's Mass Effect 2. Commander Shepard, the player character and protagonist of the game, goes to Omega to recruit him as a tech specialist for an assault on the Collector base. Shepard finds him running a clinic and distributing the cure for a currently rampant plague in a sealed-off district of the station. Mordin asks Shepard to reactivate the district's environmental systems, and distribute the cure through them. After this is done, Mordin joins the party and can be talked to aboard the Normandy, Shepard's spaceship, and brought along for future missions.

Each squadmate in Mass Effect 2 has an optional "loyalty mission". Mordin informs Shepard that his old assistant, Maelon, has been captured by krogan on Tuchanka. During the mission, which takes place in a hospital, Mordin discovers horrific tests by krogan trying to cure the Genophage, and the player may have Shepard confront him about his work on it. Eventually, Mordin finds Maelon, who is revealed to have voluntarily joined the krogan due to guilt over helping develop the Genophage. Horrified by the brutality of the tests, Mordin may kill Maelon depending on the player's actions. Mordin then discovers Maelon has found valuable data that could prove useful to curing the Genophage, and the player can choose whether to destroy it or save it.

Like every other squadmate, it is possible for Mordin to die during the final mission of the game—the "Suicide Mission"—depending on the player's choices. His chances of dying increase if the player does not complete his loyalty mission.

As a scientist, Mordin uses technology abilities in battle, particularly Incinerate and Cryo Blast, which respectively tear through armor and snap freeze enemies. He is armed with a submachine gun and a pistol. However, as he is just a scientist, he is the weakest of all the squad members, with the game's algorithm written to kill Mordin first during the suicide mission's final act should the team's defensive capabilities not be strong enough.

Mass Effect 3

Mordin was first confirmed to be appearing in 2012's Mass Effect 3 during Microsoft's E3 2011 conference, in June. Unless the player imports a save where Mordin died in Mass Effect 2, Mordin will appear on Sur'Kesh, where Shepard arrives seeking the cure for the Genophage to secure an alliance with the krogan. Mordin reveals he is the krogan's informant about the cure, which may be extracted from a cured female (whom Mordin names Eve, after the biblical figure). Mordin comes aboard the Normandy and works on the cure, and can be talked to though is not available as a squadmate.

On Tuchanka, Mordin finishes the cure and gets ready to plant it in the Shroud, a salarian construct used to alter the atmosphere of the planet. If the player has not already chosen to notify him of it, Mordin will notice salarian sabotage in the Shroud, designed to stop any cure being distributed through it. Depending on the player's choices thus far, they can choose between: letting Mordin go up to fix the sabotage and cure the Genophage, at the cost of his life; shooting Mordin to prevent the Genophage being cured (while giving the illusion that it was), ensuring salarian support; or convincing Mordin that now is not the right time to cure the Genophage, causing him to back down and go into hiding (to fake his death and thus fake the dispersing of the cure).

If Mordin survives the game, he will available to talk via holocommunication before the final mission. If a save is imported where Mordin died during the Suicide Mission, his role in the game will be replaced by another salarian named Padok Wiks.

Mass Effect: Foundation
The ninth issue of the Foundation comic series, published March 2014, focuses on Mordin's creation of the modified Genophage prior to the games' events. Mordin is introduced talking with other high-level salarians about the weakening Genophage; they agree to Mordin's proposal of strengthening it. Mordin researches and develops the new Genophage strain in less than a week, and a month later he and other STG members go to Tuchanka to test it on a krogan colony. The intended deployment site turns out to be occupied by a krogan gathering led by a female rather than being empty, and the krogan notice the STG team and fire upon them.

The team retreat back to the shuttle, and after the captain volunteers himself as a diversion, Mordin comes up with an alternate plan of planting explosives in a tunnel as a diversion instead while he and his assistant arm the dispersion unit at the original intended site. The female krogan from earlier is waiting there, and Mordin confronts her while his assistant arms the unit. As they talk, Mordin's explosions go off. The female is killed, while Mordin is rescued by the captain. The assistant begins to doubt if they're doing the right thing, but Mordin remains firm in his beliefs that the krogan are a threat if left unchecked.

Merchandise
Like other squadmates in the trilogy, Mordin was the subject of different merchandise. Figures for the characters were announced in January 2010, with Mordin and three others being announced for the second set. They were later announced to be releasing concurrently with Mass Effect 3, in March 2012, coming with free in-game content. An eight-inch tall bust of the character was made available in the BioWare store.  Dark Horse released a set of Mass Effect playing cards, featuring Mordin as the King of Diamonds and other characters in other roles.

Reception

Mordin has been positively received. 1UP.com's Jose Otero wrote an article dedicated to why Mordin was "awesome", saying he "epitomize[d] the coolest nerd in the ME universe: a mysterious, strong-willed, and scarred little scientist who delivers dialogue in quick, direct doses". GamesRadar, in a piece comparing different voice actors playing the same characters, commented that they could not tell the difference between the two performers. After hearing of a possible future Mass Effect film, Game Informers Dan Ryckert looked at the different characters and felt David Hyde Pierce would be their ideal casting choice. Tom Phillips of Eurogamer called him one of the most complex characters, and noted how he represented one of the series' "greyest" plotlines.

He was nominated for various awards: by IGN as the best Xbox 360 character of 2010 (losing to fellow ME2 squadmate Thane Krios though winning the "Reader's Choice" version), best new character of 2010 by GameSpot, and by Giant Bomb in their "Game of the Year 2010" best new character award (which he tied first-place with Bayonetta).

Since his appearance in Mass Effect 2, the character has been featured in different "top" lists. Game Informers Kimberley Wallace considered him to be one of the best BioWare characters, calling him lovable and citing "his friendly demeanor and tendency to break into song". IGN listed him as the tenth best Mass Effect squadmate, calling him polarizing and fascinating. Maximum PC called him one of the 25 best sidekicks in gaming, highlighting the moment where he can give Shepard pointers on safe-sex and interspecies romance. GamesRadar placed him at number 16 in a list of the 50 best game characters of the generation, describing him as "one of the most distinct, personable crew members to ever set foot on the Normandy". A reader's poll published by PC Gamer in 2015 reveal that Mordin was overall the third most popular Mass Effect character. 
In a 2016 article, PC Gamer ranked Mordin the second best companion of the Mass Effect series. PC Gamer staff member Tom Senior said he loves Mordin "because he shows that you don't need stubble, a gravelly voice and a thousand yard stare to be an anti-hero".  Green Man Gaming included Mordin in their top 5 list of the best characters from the Mass Effect franchise. 

His singing of Gilbert and Sullivan was highlighted. Kotaku's Mike Fahey listed it as one of their favourite gaming moments of 2010, while Gergo Vas (also of Kotaku) called it one of the most iconic moments in the trilogy. It was similarly liked by Martin Gaston of VideoGamer.com, who listed "Mordin singing" as one of the things they'd like to see in the then-upcoming third game. Both IGN's Destin Legarie and the staff of VideoGamer.com included it in lists of Mass Effects top moments. John Newby from Gamesradar was inspired by Mordin's singing and included the character in his list of 12 video game characters who would make great teachers.

Another positively received moment was his potential sacrificial death scene in Mass Effect 3, also included by Legarie in his top 13 Mass Effect moments, commenting "Watching a fan favorite die was difficult for many, and we're willing to bet it brought a tear to an eye or two." Green Man Gaming commented on his death scene, "If you don’t cry, you’re broken. Sorry, that’s just how it is". The death scene won "Best Moment" in Game Informers 2012 RPG of the Year Awards. Vas included his "curtain call" also on his "most iconic moments of the Mass Effect trilogy" list.

One of Mordin's quotes: "Hard to see big picture behind pile of corpses.", was selected by Gamesradar as one of the best video game quotes of all time.

See also

References

External links

 Fight for the Lost - Mordin .mov on the Official Mass Effect YouTube channel

Extraterrestrial characters in video games
Fictional amphibians
Fictional asexuals
Fictional characters with disfigurements
Fictional humanoids
Fictional geneticists
Fictional life scientists
Fictional epidemiologists
Fictional pathologists
Fictional physicians
Fictional singers
Fictional toxicologists
Fictional virologists
LGBT characters in video games
Male characters in video games
Mass Effect characters
Fictional scientists in video games
Fictional soldiers in video games
Video game characters introduced in 2010
Video game sidekicks